Mormecia is a monotypic moth genus of the family Erebidae. Its only species, Mormecia lachnogyia, is known from Samoa. Both the genus and species were first described by Tams in 1935.

References

Herminiinae
Monotypic moth genera